Glyn Hughes (25 May 1935 - 24 May 2011) was an English poet, novelist and artist.

His 1982 novel Where I Used to Play on the Green  won the Guardian Fiction Prize and David Higham Prize for Fiction. His Millstone Grit was published in 1975 and was included in "William Atkins's top 10 books of the moor" in 2014, and was republished by Little Toller Books in 2022 with an introduction by Ben Myers.

Selected publications
Millstone Grit (1975,)
Towards the Sun: poems & photographs (1971, Harry Chambers, Phoenix Pamphlet Poets, Manchester)
Where I Used to Play on the Green (1982,)

References

External links

1935 births
2011 deaths

People from Altrincham
People from Hebden Bridge
20th-century English poets
20th-century English novelists